The Battle of the Lake of Two Mountains was a battle of the Beaver Wars between the colony of New France and the Iroquois Confederacy that occurred on October 16, 1689.

The battle occurred in response to the Lachine massacre of August 1689. In October, Governor General of New France, the Marquis de Denonville dispatched a scouting party of 28 coureur des bois, under the command of Daniel Greysolon, Sieur du Lhut and Nicolas d'Ailleboust de Manthet, to search for Iroquois warriors that posed a threat to residents on the Island of Montreal. The coureur des bois came across a group 22 Iroquois at the Lake of Two Mountains. The French suffered no casualties, while the Iroquois suffered 18 deaths, 3 captured, and 1 fled. The French victory restored the confidence of the local French inhabitants.

Battle of the Lake of Two Mountains National Historic Site of Canada
The Battle of the Lake of Two Mountains was marked by a plaque in Senneville, Quebec. The site of the plaque was recognized as a National Historic Site of Canada on May 15, 1925.

See also
List of National Historic Sites of Canada in Montreal

References

National Historic Sites in Quebec
History of Montreal
1689 in New France
the Lake of Two Mountains
the Lake of Two Mountains
Lake of Two Mountains
Senneville, Quebec